Honoré Escolle (December 24, 1832–December 18, 1895), was as a French businessman from Monterey, California. He was an early pioneer who became a significant landholder in Monterey County. In 1878, he purchased  acres of the Sanchez's ranch near Gonzales, California. In the late 1880s, he sold  to Santiago J. Duckworth to build a Catholic Summer resort. This land later became Carmel-by-the-Sea, California

Early life 

Escolle was born on December 24, 1832, in Cuers, Var, France. His father was Pons Escolle (b. 1803) and mother was Marie Alexandrine Bernard. In 1847, Escolle left France to come to New Orleans, Louisiana, United States. He stayed in New Orleans for five years before he moved to California.

Professional background

In 1852, Escolle arrived in Monterey, California and established a bakery and mercantile store, at the south end of Alvarado Street in Monterey. He sold bread to John Bautista Rogers Cooper, who owned what is now the Cooper-Molera Adobe, built in 1823. Escolle's store sold pots, bread, and household goods. His kiln made flowerpots, coffeepots, baking dishes, pitchers, tiles, and jars. He sold his business in 1886 to his son-in-law, A. Manuel.

Escolle married Adelle Elisabeth Duval (1843-1912), a native of France, in 1854 in San Francisco. They had eleven children. To support his business and growing family, Escolle purchased land in Monterey, Santa Barbara, and San Luis Obispo counties. The unoccupied acreage of wooden hills in Monterey County was known as Las Manzanitas, because of the masses of manzanita that grew among the pines.

In 1872, he purchased  of land in Rancho Paraje de Sanchez, near Gonzales, California. He spent a large sum of money to improve it by planing  in fruit trees. He had a residence on this ranch where he lived with his family. 

In early 1888, Santiago J. Duckworth approached Escolle, with plans of subdividing the Las Manzanitas property and building a Catholic Summer resort near the refurbished Carmel Mission as one of the main attractions. Escolle agreed to sell  of land to Duckworth. The land began at the top of the Carmel Hill and ran past the Hatton Ranch Dairy, down through Ocean Avenue to Junipero Avenue.

Escolle continued to be involved in real estate transactions in Carmel City after the sale to Duckworth. Beginning on October 12, 1889, Escolle and his wife sold lots in Carmel City at $5 per lot. These real estate transactions continued the next year on May 11, 1890, July 23, 1890, and on September 4, 1890. On  September 19, 1890, Escolle sold to S. J. Duckworth all the unsold portion of tract No. 1 in Carmel City for $5. The real estate transactions continued in December 1890 through January 1993.

In 1889, Escolle, who lived in Monterey, bought a  ranch two miles southwest from Gonzales, which he called the Escolle Ranch. He grew alfalfa, oranges, cherries, and almonds.

On November 17, 1892, Duckworth decided to move into politics and handed over all the unsold lots to Escolle. Because of the Panic of 1893, sales were stagnant and the Carmel City project was losing money. In March 1901, real estate developer James Franklin Devendorf had plans to revive Carmel City. In 1902, he purchased the unsold land in Carmel from Duckworth with financial backing of San Francisco attorney Frank Hubbard Powers. They formed the Carmel Development Company on November 25, 1902, which established the artists and writers' colony that became  Carmel-by-the-Sea in 1903.

Death

Escolle died at his home in Monterey, California, on December 18, 1895, at the age of 62. His funeral took place at the family residence, at Hartnell Street, Monterey. His remains were taken to the San Carlos Catholic Church for the funeral service, after which the Monterey Freemasonry Lodge No. 217, F.& A.M. arranged for his interment at the San Carlos Cemetery in Monterey, California. His wife, Adelle Duval Escolle, died on March 18, 1912, in San Mateo, California.

See also
 Timeline of Carmel-by-the-Sea, California

References

External links

 Carmel Heritage website
 Cooper-Molera Adobe
 Audio recording about the story of Santiago Duckworth and the Catholic Resort

1832 births
1895 deaths
People from Var (department)
People from Monterey, California